The Department of Education, Sport and Culture (Rheynn Ynsee Spoyrt as Cultoor) is a department of the Isle of Man Government.

The department was formerly the Department of Education and Children and was renamed as the Department of Education, Sport and Culture under Statutory Document No. 2017/0325 with effect from November 2017.

The current Minister (since 2021) is Julie Edge.

History
The Department of Education was renamed during the Government shake up of April 2010 as Department of Education and Children.

The Board of Education for the Isle of Man was established as a Board of Tynwald in 1872, and renamed the Council of Education in 1899.  It was reconstituted and renamed the Isle of Man Board of Education in 1946. Its function was to oversee and provide funds to the elected local school boards, and after 1920 to the popularly elected Isle of Man Central Education Authority which replaced them.  The Authority was renamed the Isle of Man Education Authority in 1923. The Isle of Man Education Act 1949, which was based on the UK 'Butler Act' of 1944, preserved this two-tier structure, the Board assuming the role of the Ministry of Education and the Authority that of a local education authority.

As the Isle of Man Government gained greater autonomy after 1950, a separate Education Authority of 24 elected members, parallel to and rivalling the House of Keys, became increasingly anomalous and unwieldy, but it proved very tenacious of life.  An attempt to rationalise the system in 1968 resulted only in the merger of the Authority with the Board, which thereafter consisted of 5 "Tynwald members" appointed by Tynwald and 24 elected "non-Tynwald members", the former having control over finance and certain powers of veto.

The Department of Education was set up in 1987 as part of the new ministerial system, but a further attempt to remove the elected element was only partly successful. The Board was reconstituted as a body of 15 elected members with greatly reduced functions; in effect it became a panel from which members of the governing bodies of primary and secondary schools and the Isle of Man College were drawn. It was finally dissolved in June 2009.

Previous Ministers

Previous Ministers for Education and Children
Julie Edge MHK, 2021–present
Alex Allinson MHK, 2020–2021
Graham Cregeen MHK, 2016–2020
Tim Crookall MHK, 2012–2016
Peter Karran MHK, 2011-2012
Eddie Teare MHK, 2010-2011

Previous Ministers for Education
Anne Craine MHK, 2006-2010
David Anderson MHK, 2004-2006
Steve Rodan MHK, 1999-2004
Edgar Mann MHK, 1996-1999
Noel Cringle MLC, 1995-1996
Hazel Hannan MHK, 1991-1995
Ron Cretney MHK, 1990-1991
Victor Kneale MHK, 1986-1990

Previous Chairmen of the Board of Education
Victor Kneale MHK, 1982-1986
Noel Cringle MHK, 1978-1982
Unknown, 1976-1978
Jean Thornton-Duesbery MHK, 1972-1976
Victor Kneale MHK, 1962-1972
Henry Corlett MHK CBE JP, 1951-1962

See also
Education in the Isle of Man
List of schools in the Isle of Man

References

External links
 https://www.gov.im/about-the-government/departments/education-sport-and-culture/

Government of the Isle of Man
Educational organisations based in the Isle of Man